Hot House is a 1995 album by American musician Bruce Hornsby. It is Hornsby's second solo album and his fifth overall studio release (three previously with The Range). "Walk in the Sun" and "Cruise Control", from the album, were released as singles (with radio edits).

The album's cover art, featuring an imagined jam session between bluegrass legend Bill Monroe and jazz legend Charlie Parker, served as an apt metaphor for the rich fusion of musical styles Hornsby was developing and expanding.

The album found Hornsby expanding upon the foray into jazz sound from Harbor Lights, this time reintroducing elements of bluegrass from A Night On The Town and his earlier collaborations.  Much like the socially conscious lyrics of his earlier work, the underlying messages behind the catchy tunes are often very dark, such as on "Country Doctor", "Hot House Ball" and "White Wheeled Limousine", where story-telling lyrics build around spousal murder, nuclear disaster, and wedding-day adultery, respectively.

The album featured many of Harbor Lights guests, such as Pat Metheny and Jimmy Haslip.  Béla Fleck also collaborates again on banjo. The album's closing track, "Cruise Control," is the last Hornsby song on which Jerry Garcia played guitar; at a concert he performed in Buffalo, New York, in August 2008 on the anniversary of Garcia's death, Hornsby said Garcia had wanted to play on "Country Doctor", but was given an easier tune to play because of his poor health.

"White Wheeled Limousine" had debuted five years earlier as an encore to Branford Marsalis's opening act for the Grateful Dead's New Year's Concert on December 31, 1990, when Marsalis and Rob Wasserman joined Hornsby in the performance.  The Hot House version of "White Wheeled Limousine" pairs Pat Metheny's guitar with Fleck's banjo for a blisteringly intricate call-and-response alongside Hornsby's piano runs. Hot House also makes an homage to Hornsby's years with the Dead via his recasting of the chorus/bridge of the Dead's song "Estimated Prophet" as the newly lyricized Hornsby tune "Tango King."  The album also boasts a more prominent role for Harbor Lights alum John D'earth on trumpet and introduces Bobby Read on woodwinds and J. V. Collier on bass.  Read and Collier continue to perform with Hornsby.

Track listing
All songs written by Bruce Hornsby.

"Spider Fingers" – 6:44
"White Wheeled Limousine" – 5:28
"Walk in the Sun" – 4:58
"The Changes" – 5:49
"The Tango King" – 5:48
"Big Rumble" – 4:40
"Country Doctor" – 5:57
"The Longest Night" – 5:22
"Hot House Ball" – 4:41
"Swing Street" – 4:36
"Cruise Control" – 5:03

 Personnel 
 Bruce Hornsby – vocals, grand piano, synthesizers, accordion
 J. T. Thomas – organ
 J. V. Collier – bass (tracks 1, 6, 10)
 Jimmy Haslip – bass (tracks 2-5, 7-9)
 John Molo – drums
 Ornette Fogelberg – tambourine
 Bobby Read – alto saxophone, tenor saxophone
 John D'earth – trumpet
 Debbie Henry – backing vocalsAdditional personnel, by track'
2. "White Wheeled Limousine"
 Béla Fleck – banjo
 Debbie Henry – lead vocal
 Pat Metheny – guitar

3. "Walk In The Sun"
 David Hollister – backing vocals
 Levi Little – backing vocals
 Pat Metheny – guitar
 John Paris – programming
 Robert Brookins – programming

4. "The Changes"
 Pat Metheny – guitar

6. "Big Rumble"
 Joe White – lead vocals
 Glenn Wilson – baritone saxophone

7. "Country Doctor"
 Derwin "Stump" Cox – percussion
 Randy Jacobs – melody guitar
 Chaka Khan – backing vocals
 Pat Metheny – guitar solos
 Larry "Egg" Sears – percussion

8. "The Longest Night"
 Randy Jacobs – rhythm guitar
 Pat Metheny – sitar
 Louis Price – backing vocals
 John Paris – programming
 Robert Brookins – programming

10. "Swing Street"
 David Hollister – backing vocals
 Levi Little – backing vocals
 Stephen Lipson – programming

11. "Cruise Control"
 Jerry Garcia – lead guitar
 David Hollister – backing vocals
 Levi Little – backing vocals
 Randy Jacobs – rhythm guitar

Production
 Produced by Bruce Hornsby
 Engineered by Wayne Pooley
 Second Engineers – Brad Madix and Keno "Keanu" Snyder
 Additional Engineering – John Cutler, Tom Mahn, Heff Moraes and Jeff "Nik" Norman.
 Mixed by Wayne Pooley and J. T. Thomas
 Additional Mixing – Bruce Hornsby, John Molo and Bobby Read.
 Mastered by Ted Jensen at Sterling Sound (New York, NY).
 Art Direction and Design – Norman Miller and Ria Lewerke
 Cover Illustration – Gary Kelly
 Back Cover Photo – Kathy Hornsby
 Guitar Tech for Jerry Garcia – Steve Parish
 Guitar Tech for Pat Methany – Carolyn Chrzan
 Piano and Tuning Service – Leo Schatzel

References 

1995 albums
Bruce Hornsby albums
RCA Records albums